Moacir Bastos, usually known simply as Tuta (born 20 June 1974) is a Brazilian retired footballer who played as a striker.

Club career
Born in Palmital, São Paulo, during his career, he played for several clubs, most of them from Brazil: Araçatuba in 1994, 1995, and 1996, XV de Piracicaba in 1995, Juventude in 1996, Guarulhos in 1996, Paulista in 1997, and 1998, Portuguesa in 1997, Atlético Paranaense in 1998, Vitória in 1999, Flamengo in 2000 and 2002, Palmeiras in 2000 and 2001, Coritiba in 2004, and Fluminense, in 2005 and 2006.

He played for three non-Brazilian teams, Venezia, of Italy, in 1998-99, FC Seoul was then known as Anyang LG Cheetahs of South Korea, K League, in 2002 and Suwon Samsung Bluewings, also of South Korea, in 2003.

On January 24, 1999, he became well known after scoring a goal in the last minute in the 2-1 S.S.C. Venezia victory against Bari. Many Venezia players did not celebrate the goal or the victory, raising suspicions that the match was fixed to end in a draw. Tuta told the press that he had suspected a deal to end the match in a draw. However, on January 27, he denied his previous affirmation, justifying it as a misinterpretation by the press due to his limited capacity of speaking the Italian language.

References

External links
 
 

1974 births
Living people
Association football forwards
Brazilian footballers
Brazilian expatriate footballers
Brazil international footballers
Esporte Clube XV de Novembro (Piracicaba) players
Esporte Clube Juventude players
Associação Portuguesa de Desportos players
Club Athletico Paranaense players
Venezia F.C. players
Esporte Clube Vitória players
CR Flamengo footballers
Sociedade Esportiva Palmeiras players
FC Seoul players
Coritiba Foot Ball Club players
Suwon Samsung Bluewings players
Fluminense FC players
Grêmio Foot-Ball Porto Alegrense players
Figueirense FC players
Associação Desportiva São Caetano players
Clube Náutico Capibaribe players
Resende Futebol Clube players
Brasiliense Futebol Clube players
União Agrícola Barbarense Futebol Clube players
Clube Atlético Juventus players
Esporte Clube Flamengo players
Campeonato Brasileiro Série A players
Serie A players
K League 1 players
Expatriate footballers in Italy
Expatriate footballers in South Korea
Footballers from São Paulo (state)
Brazilian expatriate sportspeople in Italy
Brazilian expatriate sportspeople in South Korea
Clube Atlético Taboão da Serra players